The Adelaide Strikers are a cricket team based in Adelaide, South Australia, which competes in the Big Bash League (BBL). The team was established in 2011 as part of the creation of the BBL, a revamp of Australia's domestic Twenty20 competition. The Strikers have participated in every edition of the BBL, winning the competition once in the 2017–18 season. As of the end of the 2021–22 season, eighty cricketers have played for the Strikers. Cricket Australia initially restricted each BBL team to two players from other countries on their lists, expanding this to three players ahead of the 2020–21 season. As a result, the vast majority of these players are Australian nationals.

Men's team players

Statistics are correct to the end of the 2021–22 Big Bash League season.

Captains
''Statistics are correct to the end of the 2021–22 Big Bash League season.

See also
 List of Big Bash League captains

References

Adelaide Strikers